Bronze Age religion may refer to:

Religions of the ancient Near East
Sumerian religion
Assyro-Babylonian religion
Canaanite religion
Ancient Egyptian religion
Minoan religion
Hittite religion
Mycenaean religion
Rigvedic religion (the late Bronze Age to early Iron Age in India)
Reconstructed (Eneolithic to Early Bronze Age) Proto-Indo-European religion
Reconstructed Proto-Indo-Iranian religion

See also
Prehistoric religion

Religion